Incumbent Republican Richard W. Mallary beat Democrat William H. Meyer, 65.0% – 35.0%.

See also 
 List of United States representatives from Vermont

1972
Vermont
1972 Vermont elections